Quetzal is a bilingual (Spanish-English) Chicano rock band from East Los Angeles, California.

History

The band was founded by Quetzal Flores in 1993 in a Chicano owned cafe, Troy cafe, in the Little Tokyo neighborhood of Los Angeles. Martha Gonzalez joined the group in 1995. They helped start the Seattle Fandango Project in 2009 when Martha Gonzalez moved to Seattle to complete her PhD in Gender, Women & Sexuality Studies at the University of Washington.

Quetzal is an ensemble of musicians, joined for the goal of creating good music that tells the social, cultural, political, and musical stories of people in struggle. Martha Gonzalez, the band's lead singer, percussionist, and songwriter, calls it an “East LA Chican@ rock group,” summing up its roots in the complex cultural currents of life in the barrio, its social activism, its strong feminist stance, and its rock and roll musical beginnings.

Music style 
Quetzal plays a mix of Mexican and Afro-Cuban rhythms, jazz, rhythm and blues, and rock music. Inspired by the Zapatistas, they incorporate fandango and san jarocho in their music.

In 1992, Chicano rock guitarist Quetzal Flores discovered the burgeoning revival of traditional music of Veracruz called son jarocho which is born from a community fiesta called a fandango. Quetzal Flores described the community of fandango in the L.A. area as a necessary practice because "I think it's because as human beings we are kind of lacking this sort of connection, like these one-on-one connections in this high tech world." Flores incorporated san jarocho and fandango into his own music style, which is influenced by The Smiths, Ruben Blades, Stevie Wonder, and others.

Flores’s approach to music was also influenced by the East L.A. musical scene of Mexican musica ranchera, salsa, Chicano Rock, R&B, and international popular music. Raised in a family of social activists, he saw music as a means to work for social justice as well as a form of creative expression. For the band, music expresses the ultimate struggle for dignity.

Career

Quetzal was featured in the soundtrack to the 2004 short film Stand Up For Justice: The Ralph Lazo Story. In 2013, the band won a Grammy for Best Latin Pop, Rock or Urban Album.
Martha Gonzalez and Quetzal Flores are co-producers of Entre Mujeres, a CD released in 2012. The band was invited to speak and perform in the U.S. Library of Congress and Kennedy Center's Homegrown music series. The Smithsonian Institution's traveling exhibit "American Sabor: Latinos in U.S. Popular Music" feature Quetzal as leaders and innovators of Chicano music. Smithsonian Folkways label released the 2013 Grammy-winning CD Imaginaries, marking the importance of Gonzalez's past and ongoing work. They have also been instrumental in developing Fandango Sin Fronteras, a dialog between Chicanos and Chicanas from California and jarochos-musicians who play the Veracruz style.

Quetzal's work has been the subject of a range of publications, including dissertations, scholarly books, and newspaper articles, most notably Patricia Zavella's I'm Neither Here Nor There: Mexicans' Quotidian Struggles with Migration and Poverty.

Album: Imaginaries
Imaginaries refers to scholar Emma Pérez's book, The Decolonial Imaginary: Writing Chicanas into History. To the band it's about creating and occupying a physical and conceptual space outside the established structures of capitalism and government. It's a safe space created by neighbors, or musicians, or artists, or kids, or adults, or viejitos, or a combination of any of these. They're inspired to create community around music, a communion where the listener is as much musician as the people on the stage holding the instruments.

Quetzal won the Grammy for Latin rock, urban or alternative album for its release Imaginaries (Smithsonian Folkways Recordings), a foray into cumbia, neo-'80s-style R&B, Cuban charanga and Brazilian pandeiro, charged with the band's collectivist political passion. It is the band's first Grammy.

On Imaginaries, they combined the traditional son jarocho of Veracruz, salsa, R&B, and more to express the political and social struggle for self-determination and self-representation, which ultimately is a struggle for dignity. The albim had 12 tracks, 55 minutes, 40-page booklet with bilingual notes.
This album is part of the Smithsonian Folkways Tradiciones/Traditions series of Latino music albums, produced with support by the Smithsonian Latino Center.

Line-up

Current band members
 Martha Gonzalez — lead and backing vocals, congas, chekere, tarima, cajon, tap dance, jarana
 Tylana Enomoto — backing vocals, violin
 Juan Perez — electric bass, baby bass, double bass
 Quetzal Flores — jarana jarocha, requinto jarocho, bajo sexto, electric and acoustic guitars
 Quincy McCrary — lead and backing vocals, Rhodes piano, Hammond B3, keyboard
 Alberto Lopez — percussion

Former band members
Gabriel Tenorio
Gabriel Gonzalez
Daphne Chen
Kiko Cornejo Jr.
Dante Pascuzzo
Edson Gianesi
Danilo Torres
Camilo Landau
Rocio Marron
Ray Sandoval
Yunior Terry
Lilia Hernandez
Ruben Gomez
Maceo Hernandez
Robert Guerrero
Anton Morales
E Anthony Martinez

Discography 
Solo albums
1998: Quetzal (produced by John Avila)
2002: Sing The Real (produced by Greg Landau)
2003: Worksongs (produced by Steve Berlin)
2006: Die Cowboy Die (produced by John Avila)
2012: Imaginaries (Produced by Quetzal Flores) Smithsonian Folkways Recordings
2014: Quetzanimales
2017: The Eternal Getdown Smithsonian Folkways Recordings
2021: Puentes Sonoros Smithsonian Folkways Recordings
Compilation albums
A Fair Forgery of Pink Floyd (features Quetzal covering Pink Floyd's song "Mother")

References

External links 

 Official Quetzal Website
 Quetzal on Instagram
 Entre Mujeres
 Women Who Rock homepage

Rock music groups from California
Latin music groups
Latin American music
Chicano rock musicians
Mexican-American culture in Los Angeles
Grammy Award winners